Senator Sandoval may refer to:

Martin Sandoval (born 1964), Illinois State Senate
Paula Sandoval (fl. 2010s), Colorado State Senate